Portrait of a Man (Self Portrait?) (also Portrait of a Man in a Turban or Portrait of a Man in a Red Turban) is an oil painting by the Early Netherlandish painter Jan van Eyck, from 1433. The inscription at the top of the panel, Als Ich Can (intended as "as I/Eyck can") was a common autograph for van Eyck, but here is unusually large and prominent. This fact, along with the man's unusually direct and confrontational gaze, have been taken as an indication that the work is a self-portrait.

Probably his Portrait of Margaret van Eyck was a pendant, although her only known portrait is both dated 1439 and larger. It has been proposed that van Eyck created the portrait to store in his workshop so that he could use it to display his abilities (and social status, given the fine clothes evident in the portrait) to potential clients. However, his reputation was such in 1433 that he was already highly sought after for commissioned work.

The panel has been in the National Gallery, London, since 1851, having been in England since Thomas Howard, 21st Earl of Arundel acquired it, probably during his exile in Antwerp from 1642 to 1644.

Frame and inscription

The original frame survives (the vertical sides are in fact a single piece of wood with the central panel), and has the painted inscription "" ("Jan van Eyck Made Me on October 21, 1433") at the bottom, and at the top, the motto "" ("As Well As I Can"), which appears on other van Eyck paintings, always written in Greek letters, and includes a pun on his name. As on other van Eyck frames, the letters are painted to appear carved.

Autographing and dating panel paintings in the early 15th century was unusual. Even when dates were added they tended to be for the year only, whereas here van Eyck spells out the specific date, October 21. As too few of his paintings survive (the extant works number somewhere in the low 20s) to judge his prolificacy, the degree of detail and skill indicates that they took months rather than days to complete. Thus, the date may have served as a boast to potential commissioners rather than as a matter of fact.

Since the motto Als Ich Can appears in many of van Eyck's other works, it is believed that he is challenging other artists to do better than him. Although written in Greek letters, the phrase is originally Flemish. Having a Flemish phrase in Greek writing implies van Eyck saw himself in "competition with the ancients as well as with his contemporaries". Regardless of his reasoning behind including the motto in many of his works, it can be implied the phrase is a sign of van Eyck's self-consciousness about his work as a painter.

Description
Like all van Eyck's portraits, it shows a sharp and detailed analysis of the subject. The painting is a third life-size with the sitter sitting in three-quarters profile. His stubbled face is heavily lined with the onset of middle age, and his eyes are semi-bloodshot. He looks outwards with a piercing gaze, looking directly at the viewer—possibly being the first portrait in a millennium to do so. His weary facial expression is achieved through a combination of his strong nose, tightly pursed wide mouth and the framing of his face by the headdress. The overall expression is of a man, who one scholar says "see things – himself included – in close-up, but without losing track of the bigger picture."

The subject is often thought to be van Eyck himself, though there is no direct evidence for this. His direct gaze may be after the artist studying himself in a mirror. The costume is appropriate for a man of van Eyck's social position, and the motto is his personal one, otherwise only appearing on two surviving religious paintings, two more known only from copies, and the portrait of his wife. In none of these is it as prominent as here, a primary reason, along with the very direct but bloodshot gaze, why the work is usually viewed as a self-portrait. Some art historians view the work as a form of calling card for prospective clients, where van Eyck may be saying "look at what I can do with paint, how lifelike I can make my figures".

The man is not, as it is commonly thought, wearing a turban, but a chaperon with the ends that normally hang down tied up over the top, which would be a sensible precaution if it was worn whilst painting.
A similar chaperon is worn by a figure in the background of van Eyck's Rolin Madonna, and it has been suggested that this is also a self-portrait. Depicting the lines and folds of a chaperon would allow an artist to overtly display his skill. More so, the positioning of its long cornette may directly refer to his occupation as a painter—it is rolled up, perhaps to keep it out of way as he freely applies paint. The emphasis on the sitter's sharp and keenly intelligent bloodshot eyes is a further subtle clue, one found again later in Albrecht Dürer's 1500 Self-Portrait.

Typically for van Eyck, the head is a little large in relation to the torso. The technique shows the "skill, economy and speed" of van Eyck's best work. Campbell describes the painting of the left eye as follows: "The white of the eye is laid in white mixed with minute quantities of red and blue. A very thin scumble of red is brought over the underlayer, which is, however, left exposed in four places to create the secondary highlights. The veins are painted in vermilion into the wet scumble. The iris is ultra-marine, fairly pure at its circumference but mixed with white and black towards the pupil. There are black flecks near the circumference and the pupil is painted in black over the blue of the iris. The principal catchlights are four spots of lead white applied as final touches, one on the iris and three on the white, where they register with the four secondary lights to create the glistening effect."

References

Footnotes

Citations

Sources

Campbell, Lorne. The Fifteenth Century Netherlandish Paintings. London: National Gallery Catalogues (new series), 1998. . . . . (also titled The Fifteenth Century Netherlandish Schools)
Hall, James. The Self-portrait: A Cultural History. London: Thames & Hudson, 2014. 
Nash, Susie. Northern Renaissance art. Oxford: Oxford University Press, 2008. 
Janson, Horst W., and Penelope J. E. Davies. Janson's History of Art: the Western Tradition. Pearson Education, 2016. 
 Borchert, Till-Holger. Van Eyck. London: Taschen, 2008.

External links

National Gallery
Jan van Eyck, Portrait of a Man in a Red Turban (Self-Portrait?), 1433, Smarthistory

1433 paintings
Portraits by Jan van Eyck
Collections of the National Gallery, London
15th-century portraits
Self-portraits